Gonorynchus is a genus of long thin gonorynchiform ray-finned fish, commonly called beaked salmon or beaked sandfish that live on sandy bottoms near shorelines. There are five known extant species which are placed in this genus. All have a distinctive angular snout (hence the name) that the fish use to dig themselves into the sand.

The most widespread species is Gonorynchus gonorynchus, found in scattered locations worldwide. It is a nocturnal fish, feeding on invertebrates at night and burrowing into sand or mud during the day.

Beaked salmon are fished commercially in some areas. The flesh of Gonorynchus greyi, found around Australia and New Zealand, is reported to be "firm and of good flavour".

Species
 Gonorynchus abbreviatus Temminck & Schlegel, 1846
 Gonorynchus forsteri J. D. Ogilby, 1911
 Gonorynchus gonorynchus (Linnaeus, 1766) 
 Gonorynchus greyi (J. Richardson, 1845)
 Gonorynchus moseleyi D. S. Jordan & Snyder, 1923

References

Gonorynchidae
Extant Maastrichtian first appearances
Marine fish genera
Taxa named by Giovanni Antonio Scopoli